Metodi Nestorov was a Bulgarian footballer. He played in five matches for the Bulgaria national football team from 1957 to 1958.

References

External links
 

Year of birth missing
Possibly living people
Bulgarian footballers
Bulgaria international footballers
Place of birth missing (living people)
Association footballers not categorized by position